This is a list of Albanian football transfers in the summer transfer window 2010 by club.

Superliga

Besa Kavajë

In:

Out:

KF Tirana

In:

Out:

Flamurtari Vlorë

In:
 

Out:

Vllaznia Shkodër

In:

Out:

Shkumbini Peqin

In:

Out:

Teuta Durrës

In:

Out:

Skënderbeu Korçë

In:

Out:

Apolonia Fier

In:

Out:

Gramozi Ersekë

In:

Out:

References

External links
 Footballdatabase.eu

Albania
Trans
2010